Reichenbachia appendiculata is a species of ant-loving beetle in the family Staphylinidae. It is found in Central America and North America.

A subspecies of Reichenbachia appendiculata is R. appendiculata appendiculata Raffray, 1904.

References

Further reading

 
 
 
 
 
 
 

Pselaphinae
Beetles described in 1904